Hans Tronner (25 June 1883 – 7 October 1951) was an Austrian athlete. He competed in the men's discus throw at the 1912 Summer Olympics.

References

External links

1883 births
1951 deaths
Athletes (track and field) at the 1912 Summer Olympics
Austrian male discus throwers
Olympic athletes of Austria